Operation Tiger may refer to:

 Operation Tiger (Java), a series of Australian reconnaissance missions during World War II
 Operation Tiger (1940), the successful German assault on the French Fortified Sector of the Sarre during the Battle of France
 Operation Tiger (1941), a Malta convoy during World War II
 Operation Tiger (1942), an operation carried out, in the south of London, in spring 1942
 Exercise Tiger, or Operation Tiger, a 1944 practice exercise for Operation Overlord, the Allied invasion of Normandy in World War II
 Operation Tiger (1984), prosecution of London's Gay's the Word bookshop for obscene literature
 Operation Tiger (1992), or Tigar, a Croatian Army offensive ending the Siege of Dubrovnik in the Croatian War of Independence
 Operation Tiger (1994), an Army of the Republic of Bosnia and Herzegovina operation against the Autonomous Province of Western Bosnia during the Bosnian War

See also
Exercise Tiger (1942), an Army-level military exercise in the UK during World War II